Kris George is an Australian former professional boxer who competed from 2012 to 2018. He held the WBA Oceania super-lightweight title from 2014 to 2015 and the Commonwealth welterweight title from 2016 to 2018.

Professional career

George made his professional debut on 19 October 2012, scoring a first-round technical knockout (TKO) victory over Harrison Gardner at the Rumours International in Toowoomba, Australia.

After compiling a record of 5–0 (4 KOs) he faced Ozan Craddock for the vacant Queensland State welterweight title on 14 March 2014 at the Rumours International. After suffering a suspected broken left hand in the first round, George went on to win via third-round TKO.

He followed up his Queensland State title win with a unanimous decision (UD) victory against Amor Tino on 31 October 2014 at the Rumours International, moving down in weight to capture the vacant WBA Oceania super-lightweight title. One judge scored the bout 98–92 while the other two scored it 98–93. He made the first defence of his WBA regional title against future world champion Xu Can on 27 June 2015 at the Rumours International, losing by UD with all three judges scoring the bout 96–94 to hand George the first defeat of his career.

He bounced back from defeat with four wins, one by stoppage, before defeating former two-time Olympian Cameron Hammond on 25 November 2016 at the Rumours International, capturing the vacant Commonwealth welterweight title via UD with the judges' scorecards reading 119–109, 117–111 and 116–111. In his first defence he faced Jack Brubaker on 22 October 2017 at The Star in Sydney, Australia, retaining his title via sixth-round TKO after the fight was stopped due to Brubaker suffering a cut. At the time of the stoppage George was ahead on two of the judges' scorecards with 48–47 while the third judge had Brubaker ahead with 50–46. Following a knockout (KO) win against Maximiliano Scalzone in March 2018 in a non-title fight, George made the second defence of his Commonwealth title against British 2016 Olympian Josh Kelly on 16 June 2018 at the Metro Radio Arena in Newcastle, England, with Kelly's WBA International welterweight title also on the line. After seven one-sided rounds, George's corner pulled their fighter out of the contest at the end of the seventh, handing George the second defeat of his career to lose his Commonwealth title via eighth-round corner retirement (RTD).

Following his defeat to Kelly, George announced his retirement from boxing in July 2018.

Professional boxing record

References

External links

Living people
Year of birth missing (living people)
Date of birth missing (living people)
Australian male boxers
Light-welterweight boxers
Welterweight boxers
Commonwealth Boxing Council champions